Jiang Liang (born 4 November 1989) is a Chinese footballer.

Club career
Jiang Liang joined his hometown club Guizhou Zhicheng in 2008. He played 29 matches for Guizhou with the highest tackling rate in the league in 2016 as Guizhou Zhicheng won promotion to Chinese Super League. He extended his contract with the club on 14 January 2017. Jiang made his Super League debut on 3 March 2017 in a 1–1 home draw against Liaoning FC. On 28 April 2017, Jiang was sent off in a league match against Guangzhou R&F. He was sent off again five days later by roughly tackling Cleiton Silva in the 2017 Chinese FA Cup against Shanghai Shenxin. On 4 May 2017, Jiang's captaincy was stripped and received a ban of four matches as well as degraded to the reserve team by the club. His ban was officially canceled on 15 May 2017 for his positive attitude in the reserve team.

Career statistics
.

Honours

Club
Guizhou Zhicheng
China League Two: 2012

References

External links
 

1989 births
Living people
People from Guiyang
Chinese footballers
Footballers from Guizhou
Association football defenders
Chinese Super League players
China League One players
China League Two players
Guizhou F.C. players